Phyllosticta anacardiacearum is a fungal plant pathogen infecting mangoes.

References

External links
 Index Fungorum
 USDA ARS Fungal Database

Fungal tree pathogens and diseases
Mango tree diseases
anacardiacearum
Fungi described in 1973